Ilse Trautschold (27 February 1906 – 17 May 1991) was a German actress. She appeared in 45 films and television shows between 1929 and 1983.

Selected filmography
 Mother Krause's Journey to Happiness (1929)
 The Empress's Favourite (1936)
 The Green Emperor (1939)
 The Merciful Lie (1939)
 The Beaver Coat (1949)
 The Ambassador (1960)

References

External links

1906 births
1991 deaths
German film actresses
Actresses from Berlin
Rundfunk im amerikanischen Sektor people